Nunnelee is a surname. Notable people with the surname include:
Alan Nunnelee (1958–2015), American politician from Mississippi
James H. Nunnelee (1858–1921), American politician from Alabama

See also
Nunneley
Nunnely
Nunnally